Baroness Morgan may refer to:

Delyth Morgan, Baroness Morgan of Drefelin (born 1961), British politician, formerly for the Labour Party, now a 'crossbencher'
Eluned Morgan, Baroness Morgan of Ely (born 1967), British Labour Party politician
Sally Morgan, Baroness Morgan of Huyton (born 1959), British Labour Party politician
Nicky Morgan, Baroness Morgan of Cotes (born 1972), British Conservative Party politician and former Secretary of State for Digital, Culture, Media and Sport